Rowen Frederick Osborn (1924February 2012) was an Australian public servant and diplomat.

Osborn was born in 1924. He was educated at Prince Alfred College in Adelaide.

In 1948 Osborn joined the Department of External Affairs as a cadet. He graduated from his cadetship alongside Neil Currie,  and Barrie Dexter. He served in Karachi, The Hague, Tokyo and London between 1948 and 1970. He was Australian High Commissioner to Fiji and Tonga from 1970 to 1973, and to Samoa from 1972. In 1983 Osborn was appointed High Commissioner to Canada. He returned to Canberra from the posting in 1985.

Osborn died in February 2012, having been missing for several days.

References

1924 births
2012 deaths
High Commissioners of Australia to Canada
High Commissioners of Australia to Fiji
High Commissioners of Australia to Samoa
High Commissioners of Australia to Tonga